John McCormack is a former member of the Ohio House of Representatives.

References

1940s births
Democratic Party members of the Ohio House of Representatives
Living people